Cooper v. Harris, 581 U.S. ___ (2017), is a landmark decision by the Supreme Court of the United States in which the Court ruled 5–3 that the North Carolina General Assembly used race too heavily in re-drawing two Congressional districts following the 2010 Census.

Background 
At issue in particular were the 1st and 12th districts. Voters in Mecklenburg County asserted that the 1st was "akin to a Rorschach ink blot," and that the 12th, though 120 miles long, at times "averag[ed] only a few miles wide." The 12th had already been a part of several cases that went to the Supreme Court. North Carolina residents being represented by Harris deemed districts 1 and 12 unconstitutional due to the districts being designed as majority black districts after the 1990 census. Districts 1 and 12 were drawn with the black voting-age populations (BVAP) being less than fifty percent; following the 2000 census, both districts continued to vote for candidates preferred by black voters in the next five elections. Nonetheless, the Republican-controlled legislature designed a new map after the 2010 census that again redrew districts 1 and 12 as majority black, thus prompting the present lawsuit.

On February 5, 2016, the three-judge United States District Court for the Middle District of North Carolina found that both districts were unconstitutional due to the predominance of racial considerations in their creation, in which Circuit Judge Roger Gregory was joined by Judge Max O. Cogburn Jr., over the dissent of Judge William Lindsay Osteen Jr. regarding District 12.

Supreme Court 
On December 5, 2016, oral arguments were heard before the Supreme Court, where Paul Clement appeared for the governor, Marc Elias appeared for the voters, and an assistant to the U.S. Solicitor General appeared as a friend in support of the voters. The state argued that the African-American population of the districts was increased in order to comply with the Voting Rights Act of 1965, but the Court found that argument "does not withstand strict scrutiny" for the 1st district, as its African-American population had previously been less than a majority of its voters, yet African-Americans' "preferred candidates scored consistent victories."

On May 22, 2017, the Supreme Court delivered judgment in favor of Harris, voting 5–3 to affirm the judgment of the district court.  Justice Elena Kagan wrote for the Court, joined by Justices Ruth Bader Ginsburg, Stephen Breyer, Sonia Sotomayor, and Clarence Thomas.  Justice Samuel Alito, joined by Chief Justice John Roberts and Justice Anthony Kennedy, issued an opinion concurring in the judgment and dissenting in part, arguing that District 12 was constitutional. Neil Gorsuch did not take part in the case, which was argued before he was confirmed to the Supreme Court.

When the state redrew the maps from the District Order, they did not use any racial profiling data, but did rely heavily on partisan distributions. The subsequent map has been challenged again, and the case was heard by the Supreme Court as Rucho v. Common Cause in March 2019.

References

External links
 
Case page at SCOTUSblog

United States Supreme Court cases
United States Supreme Court cases of the Roberts Court
Gerrymandering in the United States